USNS Howard O. Lorenzen (T-AGM-25) is a Missile Range Instrumentation Ship built for the U.S. Navy by VT Halter Marine of Pascagoula, Mississippi. The keel was laid during a ceremony on August 13, 2008, and the vessel became operational in 2014. This ship carries a next-generation active electronically scanned array radar system named Cobra King.

Description

Manned by a combined crew of 88 sailors and civilian mariners, the ship hosts embarked military and civilian technicians from other U.S. government agencies. It is operated by the Military Sealift Command and conducts missions sponsored by the U.S. Air Force.

History
The ship is named for the late Naval Research Laboratory (NRL) electrical engineer who was instrumental in the creation of the electronic intelligence capabilities of the United States. It was due to be delivered in 2010.

In May 2011 it was announced that the ship had failed its Board of Inspection and Survey (INSURV) inspection and was being sent back for repairs before the Navy would accept the ship. The ship was judged inadequate in the electrical, damage control and aviation inspections and also had problems with her anchor, steering and the temperature in her thrust bearings.

The U.S. Navy accepted delivery of Howard O. Lorenzen on 10 January 2012. Final contract trials were completed on 5 December 2013, with transfer of some responsibilities for the ship to the US Air Force expected to occur in 2014. On 31 March 2014, the Cobra Judy Replacement (Cobra King) program reached initial operational capability (IOC). According to the Naval Sea Systems Command (NAVSEA), the U.S. Air Force also assumed operational and sustainment responsibilities for the ship.

The Howard O. Lorenzen and her Cobra King radar system were declared operational in August 2014.

See also
Cobra Dane
Cobra Ball
Cobra Eye

References

Missile range instrumentation ships of the United States Navy
2010 ships
Ships built in Pascagoula, Mississippi
Maritime vessels related to spaceflight